Tatiana Andreoli (born 1 January 1999) is an Italian recurve archer. At the 2019 European Games held in Minsk, Belarus, she won the gold medal in the women's individual recurve event.

At the 2018 European Archery Championships in Legnica, Poland, she won the silver medal in the women's team recurve event.

She competed at the 2019 World Archery Championships held in 's-Hertogenbosch, Netherlands without winning a medal.

In 2021, she represented Italy at the 2020 Summer Olympics in Tokyo, Japan. She competed in the women's individual and women's team events. She finished in 52nd place in the ranking round of the individual event and she was then eliminated in the knockout section of the event by Lisa Barbelin of France.

Andreoli and Mauro Nespoli won the bronze medal in the mixed team recurve event at the 2022 European Archery Championships held in Munich, Germany.

References

External links 
 

Living people
1999 births
Italian female archers
Archers at the 2019 European Games
European Games medalists in archery
European Games gold medalists for Italy
Competitors at the 2018 Mediterranean Games
Competitors at the 2022 Mediterranean Games
Mediterranean Games silver medalists for Italy
Mediterranean Games medalists in archery
Olympic archers of Italy
Archers at the 2020 Summer Olympics
21st-century Italian women